This list of cemeteries in Indiana includes currently operating, historical (closed for new interments), and defunct (graves abandoned or removed) cemeteries, columbaria, and mausolea which are historical and/or notable. It does not include pet cemeteries.

Allen County 
 Lindenwood Cemetery, Fort Wayne; NRHP-listed

Boone County 
 Oak Hill Cemetery, Lebanon; NRHP-listed

Daviess County 
 Old Union Church and Cemetery, Reeve Township; NRHP-listed

Dearborn County 
 River View Cemetery, Aurora; NRHP-listed

Delaware County 

 Beech Grove Cemetery, Muncie; NRHP-listed

Floyd County 

 New Albany National Cemetery, New Albany; NRHP-listed

Fountain County 
 Bethel Church and Graveyard, Logan Township; NRHP-listed

Franklin County 
 Big Cedar Baptist Church and Burying Ground, rural

Grant County 
 Marion National Cemetery, Marion
 Meshingomesia Cemetery and Indian School Historic District

Hamilton County 
 Heady Lane Cemetery, Fishers

Hendricks County 
 Sugar Grove Meetinghouse and Cemetery, Guilford Township; NRHP-listed

Johnson County 
 Greenlawn Cemetery, Franklin; NRHP-listed

Marion County 
 Big Run Baptist Church and Cemetery, Franklin Township; NRHP-listed
 Crown Hill Cemetery, Indianapolis; NRHP-listed
 Crown Hill National Cemetery, Indianapolis; NRHP-listed
 Greenlawn Cemetery, Indianapolis

Miami County 
 Francis Godfroy Cemetery, Butler Township; NRHP-listed
 Waisner-Rickard Cemetery, Deer Creek Township

Parke County 
 Pleasant Valley Cemetery, Raccoon Township

Pike County 
 Walnut Hill Cemetery, Petersburg

Porter County 

 Bailly Cemetery, Indiana Dunes National Park, Porter

Pulaski County 
 Noggle Cemetery, Cass Township

Putnam County 
 Forest Hill Cemetery, Greencastle; NRHP-listed

Rush County 
 East Hill Cemetery, Rushville

Saint Joseph County 
 South Bend City Cemetery, South Bend; NRHP-listed

Spencer County 

  Nancy Hanks Lincoln Cemetery, Lincoln Boyhood National Memorial, Lincoln City; NRHP-listed

Tippecanoe County 
 Tippecanoe Twp. District No. 3 Schoolhouse and Cemetery, Tippecanoe Township; NRHP-listed

Vanderburgh County 
 McJohnston Chapel and Cemetery, Center Township; NRHP-listed
 Oak Hill Cemetery, Evansville; NRHP-listed

Vigo County 

 Highland Lawn Cemetery, Terre Haute; NRHP-listed
 Sisters of Providence Convent Cemetery, Saint Mary-of-the-Woods

Warren County

Wayne County 
 Doddridge Chapel and Cemetery, Washington Township; NRHP-listed

See also

 List of cemeteries in the United States

References

 

Indiana